Good Luck, Sweetheart is a 2012 Brazilian drama film directed by Daniel Aragão.

Plot 
Dirceu (Vinicius Zinn) is a 30-year-old man who comes from an aristocratic family of the sertão. He works in a demolition company, helping the various transformations that the city of Recife has passed in recent years. When he meets Maria (Christiana Ubach), a student of music with soul of an artist, he shall feel the urgency for changes in his own life.

Cast 
 Maeve Jinkings as Juliana
 Christiana Ubach as Maria
 Vinicius Zinn as Dirceu

References

External links
  
 

Brazilian drama films
Films shot in Recife
2012 films
2012 directorial debut films
2012 drama films
2010s Portuguese-language films